Something Else Press was founded by Dick Higgins in 1963.  It published many important Intermedia texts and artworks by such Fluxus artists as Higgins, Ray Johnson, Alison Knowles, Allan Kaprow, George Brecht, Daniel Spoerri, Robert Filliou, Al Hansen, John Cage, Emmett Williams and by such important modernist figures as Gertrude Stein, Henry Cowell, and Bern Porter.

History

Background 

The Something Else Press was an early publisher of Concrete poetry and other works by Fluxus artists throughout the 1960s. During the 1960s in New York City some of the artists who worked at the Something Else Press included Editor-in-Chief Emmett Williams, artist Alison Knowles, poet Larry Freifeld,  novelist Mary Flanagan, artist Ronnie Landfield, and publisher/founder Dick Higgins. Fluxus artist and scholar Ken Friedman acted as general manager for Higgins from California in 1970 and 1971. Originally located in Chelsea in Manhattan, the Something Else Press eventually relocated to West Glover, in northern Vermont in the 1970s.

Changes 

While Higgins was always owner and publisher of the Press, other individuals served as editor, including Emmett Williams and Jan Herman. Herman took the job in 1973 and served until the press folded a year later. Higgins is quoted as saying about Herman:

Since Higgins had personal wealth, this account could be disputed. The press collapsed when Higgins's fortunes turned, and there was virtually no funding base in rural Vermont.

Herman disputes Higgins' account.

Complete List of Something Else Press publications

1960s 

 Jefferson's Birthday/Postface – Dick Higgins – 1964
 Ample Food For Stupid Thought – Robert Filliou – 1965
 A Primer of Happenings & Time/Space Art – Al Hansen – 1965
 The Paper Snake – Ray Johnson – 1965
 The Four Suits – Alison Knowles,  Tomas Schmit, Benjamin Patterson, Philip Corner – 1965
 DaDa Almanach – Richard Huelsenbeck – 1966
 An Anecdoted Topography of Chance – Daniel Spoerri – 1966
 The Making of Americans – Gertrude Stein – 1966
 de-coll/age happenings – Wolf Vostell – 1966
 Games at the Cedilla, or the Cedilla – George Brecht, Robert Filliou – 1967
 Dick's 100 Amusements – William Brisbane Dick – 1967
 Verbi-Voco-Visual Explorations – Marshall McLuhan – 1967
 An Anthology of Concrete Poetry – Emmett Williams – 1967
 Changes: Notes on Choreography – Merce Cunningham – 1968
 The Book of Hours and Constellations – Eugen Gomringer – 1968
 There's a Little Ambiguity Over There Among the Bluebells – Ruth Krauss – 1968
 Store Days – Claes Oldenburg- 1968
 246 Little Clouds – Dieter Roth – 1968
 Geography and Plays – Gertrude Stein – 1968
 Sweethearts – Emmett Williams – 1968
 New Musical Resources – Henry Cowell – 1969
 Notations – John Cage – 1969
 The Gutman Letter – Walter Gutman – 1969
  - Dick Higgins – 1969
 Lucy Church Amiably – Gertrude Stein -1969

1970s 

 The Aesthetics of Rock – Richard Meltzer – 1970
 The Mythological Travels of a Modern Sir John Mandeville, being an account of the Magic, Meatballs and other Monkey Business Peculiar to the Sojourn of Daniel Spoerri on the Isle of Symi, together with divers speculations thereon – Daniel Spoerri – 1970
 Fantastic Architecture – Wolf Vostell, Dick Higgins – 1970
 A Sailor's Calendar – Ian Hamilton Finlay, Gordon Huntly – 1971
 Stanzas for Iris Leak – Jackson Mac Low – 1971
 I've Left – Bern Porter – 1971
 Thomas Onetwo – Ernest M. Robson – 1971
 Typewriter Poems – ed. Peter Finch – 1972
 A Book About Love And War And Death – Dick Higgins – 1972
 1 Walked out of 2 and Forgot It – Toby MacLennan – 1972
 Found Poems – Bern Porter – 1972
 Matisse, Picasso and Gertrude Stein – Gertrude Stein – 1972
 Cancer in My Left Ball – John Giorno- 1973
 Brion Gysin Let the Mice In – Brion Gysin, ed. Jan Herman, William S. Burroughs, Ian Sommerville – 1973
 Ring Piece – Geoffrey Hendricks – 1973
 The Making of Americans – play by Leon Katz based on the book by Gertrude Stein – 1973
 Breakthrough Fictioneers – ed. Richard Kostelanetz – 1973
 One Thousand American Fungi (1902 edition) – Charles McIlvaine, Robert K. MacAdam – 1973
 The Ten Week Garden – Cary Scher – 1973
 A Book Concluding with As a Wife Has a Cow – Gertrude Stein – 1973
 How to Write – Gertrude Stein – 1973
 A Valentine for Noel – Emmett Williams – 1973
 Bio-Music – Manford L. Eaton – 1974
 Something Else Yearbook – ed. Jan Herman – 1974

Other publications 

Alongside book publications, Dick Higgins published a series of pamphlets titled The Great Bear Pamphlets. A collection of The Great Bear Pamphlets is available on UbuWeb. The Great Bear Pamphlets included essays, manifestos, and artist statements by Jackson Mac Low, Allan Kaprow, Alison Knowles, John Cage, Claes Oldenburg, Diter Rot, David Antin, and many others.

The Great Bear Pamphlets were reprinted in facsimile editions by Primary Information in 2007. Primary Information also republished Something Else Press' An Anthology of Concrete Poetry in a facsimile edition in 2013.

In 2018, Siglio Press published a posthumous collection of Dick Higgins's writings titled Fluxus, Intermedia and the Something Else Press. Selected Writings by Dick Higginsedited by Steve Clay of Granary Books and Fluxus artist Ken Friedman.

Notes

References

Further reading 
 The Great Bear Pamphlets at UbuWeb
Exhibition at the Visual Research Centre in Dundee
 Dick Higgins Collection at the University of Maryland, Baltimore County

External links 
 Primary Information's official webpage, publisher of The Great Bear Pamphlets and An Anthology of Concrete Poetry facsimiles
 Siglio Press

Fluxus
Private press movement